São Francisco de Paula is a city  in the Serra Gaúcha of the state of Rio Grande do Sul, Brazil. As of 2020, the city's population was estimated to be 21,801. The municipality was originally created on December 23, 1902.

The city is a tourist destination and is a link along two official scenic tourist routes: the Região das Hortênsias and the Rota Romântica.

The municipality contains the São Francisco de Paula National Forest, a  sustainable use conservation area created in 1968. It also contains part of the  Tainhas State Park, created in 1975.

Climate 
São Francisco de Paula features an Oceanic climate (type Cfb), with humid, cool-to-warm summers and humid, cold winters. Snowfalls may occur during winter between July and August.

Gallery

References 

Municipalities in Rio Grande do Sul